Winneway is an Indian settlement of Anishinaabe band government in the Abitibi-Témiscamingue region of Quebec. It is geographically located within the territory of Témiscamingue Regional County Municipality and is home to the Long Point First Nation.

Its population is listed as 176 in the 2021 Canadian census and about 400 on the community website.

References

External links

 Long Point First Nation (official site)
 Long Point First Nation (INAC)

Indian settlements in Quebec